Doulab Cemetery is a historical cemetery situated in the eastern suburbs of Tehran, Iran. One of the most important Christian cemeteries, it consists of five sections:
 Armenian Apostolic
 Eastern Orthodox (Russians, Georgians and Greeks)
 Roman Catholic
 Armenian Catholic
 Assyrian (Assyrian Church of the East, Chaldean Catholic and Protestant)

History of the Roman Catholic Cemetery
The origins of the Doulab Catholic Cemetery go back to the middle of the 19th century. In 1855, the young Dr. Louis André Ernest Cloquet, personal physician to Nasser al-Din Shah, died and was buried in a field situated in the Tehran district of Doulab, close to the Armenian cemetery. This patch of land was to become the burial site for all Catholics of Tehran, foreigners and locals. Dr. Cloquet's tomb, bearing a small brick cupola, can be seen up until the present day.

From the time of their arrival in Tehran in 1862, the Lazarists, being the only Catholic priests in town, took charge of the cemetery. In those days there were 87 Catholics living in Tehran, all of whom were foreigners or Chaldeans. In 1886, Joseph Désiré Tholozan, a French officer of the Légion d’honneur and physician for the French mission, purchased the terrain for the cemetery. From that time on, the cemetery was at the service of the Catholic community of Tehran, which became ever more numerous and international.

In 1942 an estimated 120,000 Polish soldiers and civilians arrived on the Iranian shore in Bandar Anzali. They had been released from Soviet captivity and were to set up the Polish Army of the East under famous General Władysław Anders. Many were so destitute and starved that they didn't survive the hardships of the journey and died upon their arrival in Iran or shortly thereafter. Because of that, the Polish Embassy purchased half of the terrain of the cemetery and arranged the graves of their many fellow countrymen, that had died in Tehran, in a convenient and worthy way.

In 1943 the Armenian Catholic community built their own cemetery next to the “Latin” one, the Chaldeans did the same in 1963, and today the complex consists of five parts totaling about 76,000 m2. In 2000 the site was listed as a national cultural heritage item (No. 2688) by the Iranian Cultural Heritage Organization (ICHTO).

Throughout the second half of the 20th century the cemetery continued to serve the Catholic community. In average five burials were held each year. However, in the 1990s the city administration revoked the permission to use the ground as a burial site. Eventually, their reasoning went, after forty years had passed, graves could be demolished and the site used for building purposes. A new location for the Catholic cemetery was identified, and Doulab seemed doomed to fall into oblivion.

National communities represented in the Catholic Cemetery include:
Germany, United States, England, Argentina, Armenia, Assyrians (Iran), Austria, Belgium, Spain, Estonia, France, Greece, Netherlands, Hungary, Iraq, Ireland, Italy, Japan, Yugoslavia, Latvia, Lebanon, Lithuania, Malaysia, New, Zealand, Pakistan, Philippines, Portugal, Russia, Sweden, Switzerland, Syria, Czechoslovakia, Turkey.

Notable burials 

 Louis André Ernest Cloquet (1818–1855) – French physician in the court of Nasser al-Din Shah
 Luigi Pesce (1828–1864) – Italian photographer
 Joseph Désiré Tholozan (1820–1897) – French physician
 Julius Gebauer (1846–1895) – a member of Austro-Hungarian Military Mission in Persia
 Alfred Jean Baptiste Lemaire (1842–1907) – French military musician and composer
 Conte de Monte Forte (fa) (1878–1916) – Austrian head of Tehran police department
 Minadora Khoshtaria (მინადორა ხოშტარია) (1881–1924) – wife of Akaki Khoshtaria (აკაკი ხოშტარია)
 Władysław Horodecki (1863–1930) – Polish architect
 Antoin Sevruguin (Անտուան Սևրուգին) (1840–1933) – Armenian-Iranian photographer
 Grish Danielian (Գրիշա խան Դանիելյան) (fa) (1886–1933) – military officer
 Vitali Sergeyev (Виталий Сергиев) (ru) (1874–1946) – Russian priest
 Vasili Dmitrievich Kargaleteli (ვასილ დიმიტრის ძე კარგარეთელი) (ru) (1880–1946) – Georgian military leader
 Vartan Salakhanian (Վարդան Սալախյան) (fa) (1931–1954) – political activist
 Grigor Mikeladze (გრიგორ მიქელაძე) (1898–1955) – Georgian military officer in the Imperial Iranian Army
 Nikolai Markov (Николай Львович Марков) (1882–1957) – Russian architect
 Ovanes Ohanian (Հովհաննես Օհանյան) (1896–1960) – film director, director of the first Iranian feature film
 Shahin Sakissian (Շահին Սարգսեան) (fa) (1910–1966) – playwright
 Sohrab Saginian (Զորա Սագինյան) (fa) (1883–1968) – politician
 Aram Garoné (Արամ Գառօնէ) (fa) (1905–1974) – author
 Markar Gharabegian (Մարգար Ավետիսի Ղարաբեկյան) (fa) (1901–1976) – poet and painter
 Jamshid A'lam (fa) (1901–1979) – senator
 Jeannette Mikhaili (fa) (1936–2006) – painter
 Anna Borkowska (d. 2008) – Polish-Iranian actress
 Helena Stelmach (fa) (1931–2017) – Polish-Iranian war veteran
 Peter Soleimanipour (fa) (1968–2018) – Russian-Iranian musician

See also
 Christianity in Iran
 Polish Cemetery in Tehran
 Tehran War Cemetery
 List of Polish war cemeteries
 Nor Burastan Cemetery
 New Julfa Armenian Cemetery

References

Cemeteries in Tehran
Cemeteries in Iran
Armenian cemeteries
Christian cemeteries